Filip Šepa (born 5 June 1990) is a Serbian professional basketball executive and former player who is the sporting director for Borac Zemun of the Second Basketball League of Serbia.

Professional career 
A shooting guard, Šepa played for Crvena zvezda, Radnički Kragujevac, Novi Sad, OKK Beograd, Kožuv, Karpoš Sokoli, CSU Craiova, Olomoucko, Zemun, Bratunac, and UBSC Graz. He retired as a player with UBSC Graz in 2019.

Post-playing career 
After retirement, Šepa joined Borac Zemun as the sporting director. His team won the 2nd-tier Cup of Serbia for the 2021–22 season.

References

External links
 Filip Sepa at eurobasket.com
 Filip Sepa at Realgm.com

1990 births
Living people
Basketball players from Belgrade
Basketball League of Serbia players
KK Bratunac players
KK Crvena zvezda players
KK Novi Sad players
KK Radnički Kragujevac (2009–2014) players
KK Zemun players
OKK Beograd players
SCM U Craiova (basketball) players
Serbian basketball executives and administrators
Serbian expatriate basketball people in Austria
Serbian expatriate basketball people in Bosnia and Herzegovina
Serbian expatriate basketball people in the Czech Republic
Serbian expatriate basketball people in North Macedonia
Serbian expatriate basketball people in Romania
Serbian men's basketball players
Shooting guards